Ushoshi Sengupta (born 30 July 1988) is an Indian beauty pageant contestant who won the title of I Am She – Miss Universe India and represented India in Miss Universe 2010 held at Mandalay Bay, Las Vegas, Nevada, on 23 August.

Early life
Born in Kolkata, Sengupta is the daughter of an official in the Indian Air Force. She graduated from Kendriya Vidyalaya, Ballygunje, Kolkata, where she excelled at mathematics and was offered a scholarship to an engineering college, but decided to pursue liberal arts and professional modeling. She has a bachelor's degree in Humanities from the St. Xavier's College of the University of Calcutta, and worked as a model before becoming Miss Universe India. Sengupta made her debut in the Bengali movie industry with Egoler Chokh which was released in August 2016 and was directed by Arindam Sil.

Filmography

Film career

Miss Universe 2010
Ushoshi won the first edition of I am She - Miss Universe India, a national pageant organized by Tantra Entertainment Private limited, in collaboration with former Miss Universe Sushmita Sen. As the official representative of her country to the 2010 Miss Universe pageant held in Las Vegas, Nevada on 23 August 2010, she participated as one of the 83 delegates who vied for the crown of eventual winner, Ximena Navarrete of Mexico.

References

External links
 
 

1988 births
Living people
Female models from Kolkata
Indian beauty pageant winners
Kendriya Vidyalaya alumni
University of Calcutta alumni
Miss Universe 2010 contestants